QI (short for Quite Interesting) is a BBC comedy panel game television show that began in 2003. It was created by John Lloyd, and was hosted by Stephen Fry until the end of Series 13 [M] after which Sandi Toksvig took over, and features permanent panellist Alan Davies. Each series covers topics that begin with a different letter of the alphabet; for example, the first series covered topics whose word began with "A". Thus it is referred to as "Series A" instead of "Series One".

QI was given a full series after BBC executives responded well to a nonbroadcast pilot and the first episode, "Adam" premiered on BBC Two on 11 September 2003. From the second to the fifth series, episodes aired each week on BBC Two; the second and subsequent episodes were shown first on BBC Four in the time-slot after the previous episode's BBC Two broadcast. When the sixth series of QI began in 2008, the show moved to BBC One and the broadcasting of episodes on BBC Four was replaced in favour of an extended repeat broadcast on BBC Two the following day, titled QI XL. From the ninth series, QI returned to BBC Two on Friday at 10 pm with the XL edition on Saturdays. Lloyd acted as the producer for the first five series. Piers Fletcher became producer starting from Series F. On 20 February 2023, recording and filming for "Series U" has begun. 

As of 17 February 2023,  episodes of QI have aired. This count does not include the unbroadcast pilot, three special episodes, 28 compilation episodes (from "Series G" onwards), and one episode containing outtakes from "Series E".

Series overview

Episodes

Pilot

Series A (2003)

Series B (2004)

Series C (2005)

Series D (2006)

Series E (2007)

Series F (2008–09) 
Beginning with "Fire and Freezing", episodes premiered on BBC One. XL editions were broadcast the following day on BBC Two, from "Flotsam and Jetsam" onwards.

Series G (2009–10)

Series H (2010–11)

Comic Relief Special (2011)

Series I (2011–12)

Sport Relief Special (2012)

Series J (2012–13)

Series K (2013–14)

Series L (2014–15)

Series M (2015–16)

Series N (2016–17)

Series O (2017–18)

Series P (2018–19)

Series Q (2019–20)

Series R (2020–21)

Series S (2021–22)

Comic Relief Special (2022)

Series T (2022–23)

Footnotes

References
General
 
 

Specific

External links
QI official website
QI Episodes Guide

QI
QI